United Nations Security Council resolution 1449, adopted unanimously on 13 December 2002, after recalling resolutions  955 (1994), 1165 (1998), 1329 (2000), 1411 (2002) and 1431 (2002), the Council forwarded a list of nominees for permanent judges at the International Criminal Tribunal for Rwanda (ICTR) to the General Assembly for consideration.

The list of nominees received by the Secretary-General Kofi Annan was as follows:

 Mansoor Ahmad (Pakistan)
 Teimuraz Bakradze (Georgia)
 Kocou Arsène Capo-Chichi (Benin)
 Frederick Mwela Chomba (Zambia)
 Pavel Dolene (Slovenia)
 Serguei Aleckseievich Egorov (Russia)
 Robert Fremr (Czech Republic)
 Asoka de Zoysa Gunawardana (Sri Lanka)
 Mehmet Güney (Turkey)
 Michel Mahouve (Cameroon)
 Winston Churchill Matanzima Maqutu (Lesotho)
 Erik Møse (Norway)
 Arlette Ramaroson (Madagascar)
 Jai Ram Reddy (Fiji)
 William Hussoin Sekule (Tanzania)
 Emile Francis Short (Ghana)
 Francis M. Ssekandi (Uganda)
 Cheick Traoré (Mali)
 Xenofon Ulianovschi (Moldova)
 Andrésia Vaz (Senegal)
 Inés Mónica Weinberg de Roca (Argentina)
 Mohammed Ibrahim Werfalli (Libya)
 Lloyd George Williams (Saint Kitts and Nevis)

See also
 List of United Nations Security Council Resolutions 1401 to 1500 (2002–2003)
 Rwandan genocide

References

External links
 
Text of the Resolution at undocs.org

 1449
2002 in Rwanda
 1449
December 2002 events